Thomas William McNamara (November 26, 1926 – January 28, 2020) was a United States Navy officer who served in the Tonkin Gulf during the Vietnam War.

Early life and education
McNamara was born November 26, 1926, in the Miners' Mills neighborhood of Wilkes-Barre, Pennsylvania. He was a son of William and Mary (Quigley) McNamara. After graduation from James M. Coughlin High School, he attended the United States Merchant Marine Academy as a midshipman from February 1945.  He was commissioned in the United States Navy Reserve as an ensign upon graduation in June 1948.

Naval career
Upon commissioning, McNamara reported for active duty as a division officer aboard the attack transport . Henrico operated in the vicinity of Qingdao until the city fell to the Chinese Communists in 1949 during the Chinese Civil War. Ensign McNamara was released from active duty in October 1949, and received a business degree from Lehigh University in 1951. He was recalled to active duty in 1952 as a lieutenant (junior grade) navigator aboard the attack transport  supporting combat operations during the Korean War. After again being released from active duty in 1954, he received a regular navy commission as lieutenant in 1955.

McNamara was executive officer aboard the minesweeper  deploying to the western Pacific to conduct training with the Republic of China Navy and Republic of Korea Navy. In May 1958 he reported aboard the destroyer  as Operations Officer in the western Pacific. Following promotion to lieutenant commander in 1959, he graduated from the Naval War College in 1962, and was executive officer aboard the destroyer  until 1964 including recovery operations for the Mercury 8 space capsule with Wally Schirra and operating off the coast of Cuba during the Cuban Missile Crisis.

McNamara was promoted to commander in 1963, and was commanding officer of the destroyer  from 1966 to 1968. Under his command, Robison deployed to Vietnam screening the aircraft carrier  and providing naval gunfire support for Operation Sea Dragon. Robison came under fire from North Vietnamese shore batteries while destroying 78 North Vietnamese waterborne logistics craft.  Robison was awarded the Meritorious Unit Commendation and McNamara received the Bronze Star Medal with "V" device.

Following promotion to captain in 1968, McNamara was commanding officer of the cruiser  from 1971 to 1973. Under his command, Chicago completed its 5th PIRAZ deployment to the Gulf of Tonkin before being recalled in response to the North Vietnamese Easter Offensive into South Vietnam. Air intercept controllers aboard Chicago directed Navy and Air Force aircraft on 14 successful shoot-downs of North Vietnamese MiG fighters, including the second MiG downed by Navy aces Duke Cunningham and William P. Driscoll. On May 9, 1972, the cruiser's forward RIM-8 Talos missile launcher shot down a North Vietnamese MiG during Operation Pocket Money.  Chicago came under fire from North Vietnamese shore batteries and received the Navy Unit Commendation.

McNamara was promoted to rear admiral in 1975, and served as the last commandant of the Ninth Naval District from 1977 until his retirement when the district was disestablished in the 1979 reorganization.

Awards
McNamara's awards include:
 Legion of Merit
 Bronze Star Medal with "V" device
 Meritorious Service Medal
 Combat Action Ribbon
 Navy Unit Commendation
 Meritorious Unit Commendation
 American Campaign Medal
 European-African-Middle East Campaign Medal
 World War II Victory Medal
 Navy Expeditionary Medal
 China Service Medal
 National Defense Service Medal with bronze star
 Korean Service Medal
 United Nations Service Medal
 Armed Forces Expeditionary Medal
 Vietnam Service Medal with silver star and two bronze stars
 Republic of Vietnam Campaign Medal with device
 Korean Presidential Unit Citation
 Republic of Vietnam Gallantry Cross

References

1926 births
2020 deaths
United States Navy admirals
United States Navy personnel of the Korean War
United States Navy personnel of the Vietnam War
Military personnel from Pennsylvania